Monachorum is a Latin word meaning "of the monks" which is used as a place name element for several places in the United Kingdom:

 Buckland Monachorum, in Devon, England
 Prestwick Monachorum, in South Ayrshire, Scotland
 Zeal Monachorum, in Devon, England

The term is also used in a number of books:

 De opere monachorum, a treatise by Saint Augustine
 Historia Monachorum, a book by Timothy of  Alexandria
 De opere monachorum, a book by Augustine of Hippo

See also

 Consensoria Monachorum, an agreement among a group of people to establish a monastic community
 Cnemaspis monachorum, also known as Monks's rock gecko, is a species of gecko endemic to Malaysia